Kristie Boogert and Nathalie Tauziat were the defending champions but only Boogert competed that year with Amanda Coetzer.

Boogert and Coetzer lost in the semifinals to Yayuk Basuki and Helena Suková.

Martina Hingis and Jana Novotná won in the final 6–2, 6–2 against Basuki and Suková.

Seeds
Champion seeds are indicated in bold text while text in italics indicates the round in which those seeds were eliminated.

 Martina Hingis /  Jana Novotná (champions)
 Yayuk Basuki /  Helena Suková (final)
 Sabine Appelmans /  Miriam Oremans (quarterfinals)
 Kristie Boogert /  Amanda Coetzer (semifinals)

Draw

External links
 1997 Sparkassen Cup Doubles Draw

Sparkassen Cup (tennis)
1997 WTA Tour